Jonadi is a comune (municipality) in the Province of Vibo Valentia in the Italian region Calabria, located about  southwest of Catanzaro and about  southwest of Vibo Valentia.

The municipality of Jonadi contains the frazioni (subdivisions, mainly villages and hamlets) Nao, Vena, Baracconi, and Case Sparse.

Jonadi borders the following municipalities: Filandari, Mileto, San Costantino Calabro, San Gregorio d'Ippona, Vibo Valentia.

Demographic evolution

References

External links
 www.jonadi.it

Cities and towns in Calabria